Crusader Kings III is a grand strategy role-playing video game set in the Middle Ages, developed by Paradox Development Studio and published by Paradox Interactive as a sequel to Crusader Kings (2004) and Crusader Kings II (2012). The game was released on PC on 1 September 2020 and on the Xbox Series X/S and PlayStation 5 on 29 March 2022.

Gameplay
Like its predecessors Crusader Kings and Crusader Kings II, Crusader Kings III is a grand strategy game and dynasty simulator set in the Middle Ages. Players begin as a character in either 867 or 1066. The game map is about four times more detailed than the one in Crusader Kings II and slightly larger, incorporating Europe, Africa roughly as far south as the Equator, and Asia as far East as Tibet. Upon the death or deposition of a player's character they may continue to play as that character's heir. Overall, players develop a dynasty over the centuries, with the game ending in 1453.

Dynasties can form cadet branches that have their own heads and act mostly independently from their parent dynasty. The heads of dynasties are able to use a new resource known as Renown to assert their control over their house. For example, the heads of houses are responsible for legitimizing bastards.

Characters have full-body, 3D-rendered character models instead of 2D portraits. As in Crusader Kings II, they have traits that affect their stats and behavior. Making choices that go against a character's traits will increase that character's stress. The game's genetics system allows characters to pass on some of their characteristics to their descendants. Characters are able to frighten their vassals into staying loyal by increasing their Dread, which increases when the character performs malevolent actions, such as executing or torturing other characters. Characters are able to select one of five lifestyles to follow. Each lifestyle has three skill trees that allow characters to enhance skills related to that lifestyle.

Players' realms may have the feudal, tribal, or clan government types. Religion and culture are both aspects of the game. Leaders can advance their goals by warfare, diplomacy, or subterfuge. Players may undergo pilgrimages and wage holy wars, and entire religions can be called to arms in crusades or jihads. Religions have Tenets, which are bonuses given to all practitioners of that faith, and Doctrines, which deal with the religion's stances towards issues like homosexuality and female clergy. The principal resource for interacting with religion mechanics is Piety, and a player with sufficient piety may choose to develop their own heresy, with the Tenets and Doctrines being chosen by the player.

Levies are represented primarily by low-quality infantry composed of peasants. Characters will need to hire men-at-arms in order to field higher-quality soldiers, such as crossbowmen and cavalry. Characters can make other characters from their court or realm with significant combat skills into powerful knights.

Development 
Game director Henrik Fåhraeus commented that development of the game commenced "about 1 year before Imperator", indicating a starting time of 2015. Describing the game engine of Crusader Kings II as cobbled and "held together with tape", he explained that the new game features an updated engine (i.e. Clausewitz Engine + Jomini toolset) with more power to run new features.

As is the case with many of Paradox's unreleased and currently supported works, the developers publish a weekly developer diary. Each post focuses on a single aspect of the game, such as government types, user interface, governments, war, etc., how this aspect of the game will be handled in Crusader Kings III, and how it is different from Crusader Kings II. A monthly update video is also published on the Paradox Interactive YouTube channel, summarising all of the changes which have been made in that month's Dev Diaries.

Release 
The game was released on 1 September 2020 and is available through Steam and Xbox Game Pass for PC. The game is available in two editions: the Base Game Edition, which includes the base game and a pre-order bonus, and the Royal Edition, which includes the base game and an expansion pass. The expansion pass contains a collection of additional content packs and the first expansion.

Crusader Kings III was initially rejected by the Australian Classification Board, reportedly over complications regarding the game's classification. The game was eventually cleared and released within Australia six days after its initial release, on 7 September 2020. Because of its delayed release, the pre-order bonus window was extended to 21 September exclusively for Australian Steam users.

A console version of the game was released on PlayStation 5 and Xbox Series X and Series S on 29 March 2022. The game was made available on Xbox Game Pass on the same day.

Expansions

Reception 

Crusader Kings III received "generally favorable" reviews for PlayStation 5 and Xbox Series X/S according to review aggregator Metacritic; the PC version received "universal acclaim". Leana Hafer of IGN wrote that the game "is a superb strategy game, a great RPG, and a master class in how to take the best parts of existing systems and make them deeper and better"; scoring it 10/10 in her review. Lauren Aitken from VG247 also gave the game a perfect score; in her review, she wrote, "Crusader Kings 3 is just as bonkers, unpredictable and enthralling as its predecessor."

David Wildgoose of GameSpot praised the procedural narratives of the game saying that they are rarely as affecting and poignant as they are here; on the other hand, as a negative point, he wrote that "when the story engine isn't firing, your actions can feel rote and uninspired".

In December 2020, Crusader Kings III was nominated in the Best Sims/Strategy Games category at The Game Awards but lost to Microsoft Flight Simulator.

The game sold more than 1 million copies within 1 month of release. It was the seventh best-selling game in September 2020 in the US, and had the highest launch month sales for any Paradox Interactive title. In March 2022, Paradox Interactive announced that Crusader Kings III had sold over 2 million units worldwide.

Notes

References

External links
 Official Crusader Kings website
 Crusader Kings III Developer Diaries
Official Wiki for Crusader Kings III

Government simulation video games
Grand strategy video games
Linux games
Paradox Interactive games
Real-time strategy video games
2020 video games
Video game sequels
Video games developed in Sweden
Video games set in the 11th century
Video games set in the 12th century
Video games set in the 13th century
Video games set in the 14th century
Video games set in the 15th century
Video games set in the Middle Ages
Windows games
PlayStation 5 games
Xbox Series X and Series S games
Multiplayer and single-player video games